Shirley Render (born April 1, 1943) is a politician in Manitoba, Canada.  She was a member of the Legislative Assembly of Manitoba from 1990 to 1999, and was briefly a cabinet minister in the government of Gary Filmon.

Early life
Born Shirley Hurst in Winnipeg, the daughter of Harold and Marg Hurst, she was educated at the University of Manitoba, receiving a Bachelor of Arts degree in 1964 and a Master of Arts degree in 1984.  She has worked as a social worker and High School teacher, and has lectured in Psychology at the University of Manitoba.  She has also worked as a magazine editor.

She married Douglas E. Render.

Aviation
Render is a member of the Royal Canadian Air Force Association, and has authored two published books on aviation history: Double Cross: The Inside Story of James A. Richardson and Canadian Airways (1999) and No Place for a Lady: the Story of Canadian Women Pilots, 1928-1992 (2000).  She is a member of the International Association of Women's Pilots and the Women and History Association, and has served as President of the Western Canada Aviation Museum (though her time as president coincided with a period of financial controversy at the museum).

Politics
Render was first elected to the Manitoba legislature as a Progressive Conservative in the 1990 provincial election in the south-central Winnipeg riding of St. Vital, defeating incumbent Liberal Bob Rose by 118 votes. She was re-elected by a greater margin in the 1995 provincial election, with the social-democratic New Democratic Party (NDP) displacing the Liberals for second place.

Render entered cabinet on February 5, 1999, the date of Premier Gary Filmon's final cabinet shuffle. She was appointed Minister of Consumer and Corporate Affairs, with responsibility for the Gaming Control Act. In the provincial election held later in the year, she lost her seat to NDP candidate Nancy Allan by over 1500 votes.

Render tried to return to the legislature in Riel, which borders her former district, in the 2003 provincial election, but lost to NDP candidate Christine Melnick by over 1000 votes.

Current work
Render is currently a member of the Community Partnership Executive at CBC Manitoba, and lectures at the Asper School of Business and Red River College. In 2001, she received a Governor General of Canada 125 award. She is currently the executive director of the Western Canada Aviation Museum.

In 2017, the city of Winnipeg opened Shirley Render Park, near St. Vital Park. The site was formerly a St. Vital landfill.

Published works

 Render, Shirley. Double Cross: The Inside Story of James A. Richardson and the Canadian Airways. Vancouver: Douglas & McIntyre, 1999. .
 Render, Shirley. No Place for a Lady: The Story of Canadian Women Pilots. Winnipeg: Peguis Publishers, 1992, 2000 (2nd ed.). .

References

Progressive Conservative Party of Manitoba MLAs
1943 births
Living people
Canadian people of German descent
Politicians from Winnipeg
Women MLAs in Manitoba
Members of the Executive Council of Manitoba
Red River College alumni
Women government ministers of Canada